The 2022 San Diego Toreros football team represented the University of San Diego as a member of the Pioneer Football League (PFL) during the 2022 NCAA Division I FCS football season. They were led by tenth-year head coach Dale Lindsey and played their home games at Torero Stadium in San Diego.

Previous season

The Toreros finished the 2021 season with a 7–4 overall record and 7–1 PFL play to be co-champions of Pioneer League championship with Davidson. Due to head to head tie breaker with Davidson, they did not receive a large bid to FCS Playoffs.

Schedule

 San Diego had a game schedule against Stetson, slated for October 1. The game was later canceled days before the game due to Hurricane Ian.

Game summaries

La Verne

at Cal Poly

at UC Davis

at Valparaiso

at Drake

Presbyterian

at St. Thomas (MN)

Butler

Davidson

at Morehead State

References

San Diego
San Diego Toreros football seasons
San Diego Toreros football